Cymbiola palawanica is a species of sea snail, a marine gastropod mollusk in the family Volutidae, the volutes.

Description

Distribution
This marine species occurs off the Philippines..

References

 Douté, H. & Bail, P., 2000. Revision of the "Cymbiola aulica" complex. La Conchiglia 293: 27-40

External links
 MNHN, Paris: holotype

Volutidae
Gastropods described in 2000